The Army Staff is the name of various military staffs in the Royal Danish Army. At multiple times it was the highest authority within the Army.

History
The original Army Staff was created following the first major restructuring following the Second World War, and consisted of the General Staff. It was responsible for war preparations (training and education), studies and planning. It supported the Army Command. After the Army Command was subjugated to the Defence Command in 1976, the Army Staff became the main command of the Army. Following the 1988 Defence Commission, it was decided that the Army Staff and the positions of Inspector of the Army would be disbanded and replaced with the Army Operational Command. Following the Danish Defence Agreement 2013–17, the Army Operational Command was disbanded, re-establishing the Army Staff. As part of the Danish Defence Agreement 2018–23, the Army Staff was abolished and changed to the Army Command again.

Chief of the Army Staff

1950–1970

1970–1990

2014–2018

See also 
 Army Command (Denmark)

References

Citations

Sources
 
 
 
 
 
 
 
 

Royal Danish Army
Staff (military)